Edward Henry Trafalgar Digby, 10th Baron Digby (21 October 1846 – 11 May 1920), also 4th Baron Digby in the Peerage of Great Britain, was a British peer and Conservative Member of Parliament.

Digby was the eldest son of Edward Digby, 9th Baron Digby, son of Admiral Sir Henry Digby. His mother was Lady Theresa Anna Maria Fox-Strangways, daughter of Henry Fox-Strangways, 3rd Earl of Ilchester, while Jane Digby was his aunt. He was elected to the House of Commons for Dorset in 1876, a seat he held until 1885. In 1889 he succeeded his father in the two baronies and took his seat in the House of Lords.

He served in the Coldstream Guards and on 28 November 1900 was appointed Honorary Colonel of the 1st Dorsetshire Royal Garrison Artillery (Volunteers).

Lord Digby married Emily Beryl Sissy Hood, daughter of Hon. Albert Hood, in 1893. He died in May 1920, aged 73, and was succeeded in his titles by his eldest son Edward Kenelm Digby. Lady Digby died in 1928. Hon. Pamela Digby, Lord Digby's granddaughter, became American Ambassador to France.

Notes

References
 Burke's Peerage, Baronetage and Knightage, 100th Edn, London, 1953.
Kidd, Charles, Williamson, David (editors). Debrett's Peerage and Baronetage (1990 edition). New York: St Martin's Press, 1990,

External links 
 

1846 births
1920 deaths
Conservative Party (UK) MPs for English constituencies
UK MPs 1874–1880
UK MPs 1880–1885
UK MPs who inherited peerages
Edward
Coldstream Guards officers
Edward 10
Edward 10
Members of the Parliament of the United Kingdom for constituencies in Dorset